The W.C. Ball House (also known as the George W. Ball House/William M. DuBois House) is a historic house located in Fairfield, Iowa.

Description and history 
Built on the edge of town in about 1876 for W. C. and Mary Ball, the house is a transitional structure between the Italianate vernacular and that of the later Victorian picturesque styles. The 2½-story frame house features bracketed eaves, a full-height bay section on the south elevation, cornice returns, a high-pitched roof, facade gable, crenellations and finials on the ridges. A prominent feature of the house are its three porches: a kitchen porch on west side, a dining room porch on south, and wrap-around porch on southeast.

The house was listed on the National Register of Historic Places on April 4, 1985.

References

Houses completed in 1876
Victorian architecture in Iowa
Houses in Fairfield, Iowa
National Register of Historic Places in Jefferson County, Iowa
Houses on the National Register of Historic Places in Iowa